King Echetus (Ancient Greek: Ἔχετος), in Greek mythology, a king of Epirus and son of Euchenor and Phlogea (Φλόγεα).

Mythology
He is mentioned in Book 18 of Homer's Odyssey, as well as in Book 21 in which he is described as the "destroyer of all mortals" by Antinous (one of the suitors).

In Book 18, the beggar Irus was threatened with being handed over to Echetus, who would then have had Irus' nose, ears and testes cut off and thrown to his dogs. A story is also described how Echetus had a daughter, Metope, who had an intrigue with a lover; as a punishment Echetus mutilated the lover and blinded Metope by piercing her eyes with bronze needles. He then incarcerated her in a tower and gave her grains of bronze, promising that she would regain her sight when she had ground these grains into flour.

Eustathius and the scholia on this passage call the daughter and her lover Amphissa and Aechmodicus respectively.

Theories on the basis of Echetus
It is thought that Echetus was a mythological creation, used to scare disobedient children or used as the villain in bedtime stories. An alternate theory is that Echetus was a real king around the time of Homer, and that he was quite deformed and possibly a cannibal; no evidence currently exists to support this theory, however.

Notes

References
 Apollonius Rhodius, Argonautica translated by Robert Cooper Seaton (1853-1915), R. C. Loeb Classical Library Volume 001. London, William Heinemann Ltd, 1912. Online version at the Topos Text Project.
Apollonius Rhodius, Argonautica. George W. Mooney. London. Longmans, Green. 1912. Greek text available at the Perseus Digital Library.
Homer, The Odyssey with an English Translation by A.T. Murray, PH.D. in two volumes. Cambridge, MA., Harvard University Press; London, William Heinemann, Ltd. 1919. . Online version at the Perseus Digital Library. Greek text available from the same website.

Characters in the Odyssey
Epirotic mythology
Kings in Greek mythology